The Residences at Greenbelt – Laguna Tower is a residential condominium skyscraper in Makati, Philippines. It is the first of three buildings being constructed as part of The Residences at Greenbelt (TRAG) complex, and is the basis of the now being constructed The Residences at Greenbelt - Manila Tower. It is expected to be one of the tallest skyscraper in the Philippines with a height of 170.75 metres from the ground to its architectural top.

The building has 48 floors above ground, which includes a 4-level podium with commercial establishments, and 3 basement levels for parking. It is considered to be one of the most prestigious residential building in the Philippines.

Location

The Residences at Greenbelt complex is located along Arnaiz Avenue (formerly known as Pasay Road), and the entire complex block is bounded by Paseo de Roxas, Greenbelt Drive and Esperanza Street. The complex was formerly the site of the old Coronado Lanes bowling center and parking lot. Being inside the Makati Central Business District, it is strategically located near malls, hotels, offices, schools, and entertainment areas. As with its name, it is part of the Greenbelt Complex which includes the Greenbelt Mall. Just right across Greenbelt Drive is the Renaissance Makati City Hotel.

The Project Team

The Residences at Greenbelt – Laguna Tower was designed by Architecture International, in cooperation with local architectural firm GF & Partners Architects. Structural design for the building was provided by Aromin & Sy + Associates, and reviewed by international engineering firm Skilling Ward Magnusson Barkshire.

The buildings mechanical engineering works was designed by R.J. Calpo & Partners; electrical engineering works design was provided by R.A. Mojica & Partners. Sanitary / plumbing engineering design and fire protection design was provided by NBF Consulting Engineers and NBF Firetech Fire Protection Systems, respectively.

Other members of the design team are Shen Milson & Wike Paoletti {Acoustics Consultant); Windtech Consultants {Wind Tunnel Consultants]; Glover / Resnick & Associates (Security Consultant); Roy Barry & Associates (Elevator Design Consultant); International Parking Design (Parking Design Consultant); ACL Asia {now E.A. Aurelio + ADI Ltd. Inc. - Landscape design); ALT Cladding & Design Philippines (Exterior Cladding); Periquet Galicia Inc. (Space Planning Consultant); and Master Joseph Chau Kam Shing (Feng Shui Consultant).

The construction team is composed of Design Coordinates Inc. (Project / Construction Management); Rider Hunt Liacor Inc. (Quantity Surveying); and EEI Corporation (General Contractor).

Property management is provided by Ayala Property Management Corporation.

During the construction phase, it is also known as the TRAG-1 Project.

See also

 The Residences at Greenbelt - San Lorenzo Tower
 The Residences at Greenbelt - Manila Tower

References

External links
 Manila Tower at Skyscraperpage.com
 The Residences at Greenbelt at Condo.Com.Ph

Skyscrapers in Makati
Residential skyscrapers in Metro Manila
Residential buildings completed in 2008